Lageado is a neighbourhood in the city of Porto Alegre, Rio Grande do Sul, Brazil. It may also refer to:

Chapadão do Lageado, a town in Santa Catarina, Brazil
The original name for the town of Guiratinga in Mato Grosso, Brazil